is a Japanese politician and a member of the House of Councillors in the Diet (national legislature).

Early life and education
Koda was born in Tono City, Iwate Prefecture, on 8 September 1965. She graduated from International Christian University's social sciences division in 1989.

Career
Kouda worked for 18 years at private sector, including an advertising agency and liquor company. In 2003, she joined the Democratic Party of Japan (DPJ). She was elected to the House of Councillors from the Saitama Prefecture for the first time on 29 July 2007. She and other three lawmakers from the DPJ resigned from the party in protest of the then prime minister Yoshihiko Noda's decision to restart the nuclear plant in Oi, Fukui Prefecture in July 2012.

References

1965 births
Living people
Members of the House of Councillors (Japan)
Female members of the House of Councillors (Japan)
Politicians from Saitama Prefecture
Democratic Party of Japan politicians
International Christian University alumni